The 2015 Euroformula Open Championship was a multi-event motor racing championship for single-seat open wheel formula racing cars that was held across Europe. The championship featured drivers competing in two-litre Formula Three racing cars built by Italian constructor Dallara which conformed to the technical regulations, or formula, for the championship. The series changed tyre supplier from Dunlop to Michelin. It was the second Euroformula Open Championship season.

RP Motorsport driver Vitor Baptista claimed the championship title by five points (on dropped scores), winning six races during the 2015 campaign, including four consecutive victories during the second half of the season. The runner-up position in the championship went to Konstantin Tereshchenko for Campos Racing, who like Baptista, took six victories during the season. The championship top-three was completed by Yu Kanamaru, who took a single race victory at Silverstone for Emilio de Villota's team. Other drivers to win races were DAV Racing's Alessio Rovera (Jerez) and Leonardo Pulcini (Red Bull Ring), while Baptista's teammate Damiano Fioravanti won at Monza. These seven wins for RP Motorsport enabled them to win the teams' championship by ten points ahead of Campos Racing.

In the Spanish Formula Three sub-classification, Tereshchenko and Campos Racing snared their respective titles. Over the three meetings at Jerez, Estoril and Barcelona, Tereshchenko won four of the six races to best Baptista by thirty-seven points, who only won once, at Estoril. Kanamaru finished a further nine points in arrears in third place. With Tereshchenko's four wins, Campos Racing finished nine points clear of RP Motorsport in the teams' championship.

Teams and drivers
 All cars were powered by Toyota engines.

 Edi Haxhiu was scheduled to compete for Corbetta Competizioni, but did not appear in any rounds.

Race calendar and results
 An eight-round provisional calendar was revealed on 5 November 2014. On 2 December 2014, it was confirmed, that the third round would take place at Estoril. All rounds, except for Jerez, supported the International GT Open series, with rounds denoted with a blue background being part of the Spanish Formula Three Championship.

Championship standings

Euroformula Open Championship

Drivers' championship
Only the fourteen best results counted towards the championship. Points were awarded as follows:

Teams' championship
Points were awarded as follows:

Spanish Formula Three Championship

Drivers' championship
Points were awarded as follows:

Teams' championship
Points were awarded as follows:

References

External links
 

Euroformula Open Championship seasons
Euroformula Open
Euroformula Open
Euroformula Open